"Propellant 23" is the second episode of the second series of the 1960s cult British spy-fi television series The Avengers, starring Patrick Macnee and Honor Blackman. It was first broadcast by ABC on 6 October 1962. The episode was directed by Jonathan Alwyn and written by Jon Manchip White.

Plot
Steed and Cathy must retrieve a flask of top secret rocket fuel stolen from a murdered courier at a French airport.

Cast
 Patrick Macnee as John Steed
 Honor Blackman as Cathy Gale
 Justine Lord as Jeanette 
 Katherine Woodville as Laure
 Geoffrey Palmer as Paul Manning
 Ralph Nossek as Roland
 Barry Wilsher as Pierre
 John Crocker as Lt. 'Curly' Leclerc     
 Trader Faulkner as  Jacques Tissot  
 John Dearth as Siebel  
 Frederick Schiller as Jules Meyer 
 Nicholas Courtney as Captain Legros
 Michael Beint as Co-Pilot, Robert
 John Gill as Baker, Jean Martan
 Graham Ashley as Gendarme
 Deanne Shendey as Shop Assistant

References

External links

Episode overview on The Avengers Forever! website

The Avengers (season 2) episodes
1962 British television episodes